Tom Hess is a touring guitarist, recording artist and a former member of the band Rhapsody of Fire from 2010 until 2013. Hess also toured Europe and US with the band HolyHell  and recorded the EP "Apocalypse" which landed on the charts in Germany, Austria and Switzerland.

In addition to his professional music career as a recording artist, Tom is also an online guitar teacher and a mentor to musicians, guitar teachers and rock bands around the world.

Biography 
Hess began playing guitar on January 31, 1986 inspired by heavy metal bands such as Metallica, Def Leppard and Iron Maiden.  His musical style later evolved from hard rock and heavy metal to the neo-classical and progressive rock styles, influenced by artists such as: Yngwie Malmsteen, Dream Theater, Symphony X, Andy Larocque, Jason Becker, Fryderyk Chopin, Gustav Mahler, Johannes Brahms and Claude Debussy.

Hess went on to receive two music degrees: one in music theory and another in music composition. In addition to his music school background, Hess also studied guitar with many guitar teachers, most notably with Lion Music recording artist George Bellas.

Rhapsody of Fire
On April 15, 2011 it was announced that guitarist Tom Hess has become a new official member of the epic metal band Rhapsody of Fire. His playing can be heard on the band's album From Chaos to Eternity. Hess recorded all the rhythm guitar parts and contributed several solos for the CD. Hess began touring with the band at the festivals that took place in the summer of 2011.

Alex Staropoli, Rhapsody of Fire’s keyboard player, released a statement saying: "I saw Tom Hess playing on stage several times and was always impressed by his great stage presence and his way of playing. When I heard the rhythm and solo guitars he recorded for Rhapsody Of Fire I was blown away, I could feel that strong presence in between every single note."

Rhapsody of Fire's 2011 release "From Chaos to Eternity" was listed in the top 100 album charts in many countries around the world, such as Japan, Italy, Switzerland, German, France and many others.

Bands

HESS Band

In 1994, Tom Hess formed the progressive rock band "HESS" along with his brother Scott Hess.  
To date, the band has released 2 full-length albums: "Opus 1" (April 20, 2000) and "Opus 2" (January 4, 2004).  Both albums have sold in more than 26 countries around the world, and remain among the top sellers in the Neo-Classical and Progressive categories at the instrumental guitar music distributor Guitar9.com.

Current lineup of the HESS band:

Tom Hess - Guitars and Composition
Mike Walsh - Guitars
Scott Hess - Drums
Mark Carozza - Bass

HolyHell Years (2004-2008)

In 2004, Hess joined a power metal band HolyHell.  The band went on tour in 2005, before releasing its first album.  Tom Hess and HolyHell played alongside bands such as Black Sabbath (Heaven and Hell), Motorhead, Nightwish, Epica, Testament, Manowar and Rhapsody of Fire performing for crowds of up to 30,000 people. Some of the band's notable performances included the Earthshaker's Festival in Germany and Masters of Rock Festival in the Czech Republic where the band performed the cover of "The Phantom Of The Opera".

In 2007, the band's first album Apocalypse was released  and HolyHell went on tour the second time.

In 2008, Hess left HolyHell to focus on other aspects of his music career.

In addition to touring the world, mentoring musicians online and recording music, Hess also performs instructional guitar clinic tours.

Discography

 HESS - Opus 1 (2000)
 HESS - Opus 2 (2004)
 HolyHell - Apocalypse (2007)
 Rhapsody of Fire - From Chaos to Eternity (2011)

References

Rhapsody of Fire members
Year of birth missing (living people)
Living people
American heavy metal guitarists
Guitarists from Illinois